Prospekt may refer to:

 Prospekt (album), an album by Circle
 Prospekt (street), a term for a straight broad street, avenue or boulevard in Russia and other post-Soviet states
 Prospekt (video game), a fan-made sequel in the Half-Life video game series

See also
Prospect (disambiguation)
Prospekt's March, an EP by Coldplay